The 1998 FIVB Volleyball Women's World Championship qualification was a qualification event, played in 1997 and 1998, for the thirteenth edition of FIVB Women's World Championship, which was held in Japan from November 3 to November 12, 1998. The event was split into several groups divided by continent.

Qualified teams
{| class="wikitable sortable" style="text-align: left;"
|-
!width="140"|Team
!width="80"|Confederation
!width="200"|Qualified as
!width="110"|Qualified on
!width="70"|Appearancein finals
|-
|  || AVC ||  ||  || 
|-
|  || AVC ||  ||  || 
|-
|  || AVC ||  ||  || 
|-
|  || CEV ||  ||  || 
|-
|  || CEV ||  ||  || 
|-
|  || AVC ||  ||  || 
|-
|  || CEV ||  ||  || 
|-
|  || CSV ||  ||  || 
|-
|  || CSV ||  ||  || 
|-
|  || NORCECA ||  ||  || 
|-
|  || CEV ||  ||  || 
|-
|  || CEV ||  ||  || 
|-
|  || CEV ||  ||  || 
|-
|  || NORCECA ||  ||  || 
|-
|  || CAVB ||  ||  || 
|-
|  || NORCECA ||  ||  || 
|}

1.Competed as Soviet Union from 1952 to 1990; 2nd appearance as Russia.
2.Competed as West Germany from 1956 to 1990; 2nd appearance as Germany.

Confederation qualification processes
The distribution by confederation for the 1998 FIVB Women's Volleyball World Championship was:

 Asia and Oceania (AVC): 3.5 places (+ Japan qualified automatically as host nation for a total of 4.5 places)
 Africa (CAVB): 1 place
 Europe (CEV): 5.5 places
 South America (CSV) 2 places
 North, Central America and Caribbean (NORCECA): 3 places

Africa
6 national teams entered qualification. (Malawi later withdrew) The teams were distributed according to their position in the FIVB Senior Women's Rankings. Teams ranked 1–2 automatically qualified for the second round.

Sub Pool a
Venue:  Tunis, Tunisia
Dates: April 10–12, 1997

|}

|}

Pool A
Venue:  Nairobi, Kenya
Dates: February 27 – March 1, 1998

|}

|}

Asia and Oceania
9 national teams entered qualification. The teams were distributed according to their position in the FIVB Senior Women's Rankings. Teams ranked 1–7 automatically qualified for the second round.

Sub Pool b
Venue: Home and Away
Dates: June 8–15, 1997

|}

|}

Pool B
Venue:  Chengdu, China
Dates: June 27–29, 1997

|}

|}

Pool C
Venue:  Suwon, South Korea
Dates: July 4–6, 1997

|}

|}

Playoff
Venue: Home and Away
Dates: September 12–18, 1997

|}

|}

 Chinese Taipei advanced to the Asia-Europe playoff but later withdrew.

Europe
23 national teams entered qualification. The teams were distributed according to their position in the FIVB Senior Women's Rankings. Teams ranked 1–17 automatically qualified for the second round.

Sub Pool c
Venue: Home and Away
Dates: May 23 – June 14, 1997

|}

|}

Sub Pool d
Venue: Home and Away
Dates: May 17 – June 7, 1997

|}

|}

Sub Pool e
Venue: Home and Away
Dates: May 3–25, 1997

|}

|}

Pool D
Venue:  Moscow, Russia
Dates: September 12–14, 1997

|}

|}

Pool E
Venue:  Amsterdam, Netherlands
Dates: September 19–21, 1997

|}

|}

Pool F
Venue:  Vicenza, Italy
Dates: January 9–11, 1998

|}

|}

Pool G
Venue:  Bremen, Germany
Dates: January 2–4, 1998

|}

|}

Pool H
Venue:  Sofia, Bulgaria
Dates: September 12–14, 1997

|}

|}

Playoff
 Two runner-up teams having best rank in FIVB World Ranking advance to CEV playoff.
Venue: Home and Away
Dates: January 25 – February 1, 1998

|}

|}

 Italy advanced to the Asia-Europe playoff but Chinese Taipei withdrew and Italy qualified directly to the World Championship.

North, Central America and Caribbean
7 national teams entered qualification.

Pool I
Venue:  Santo Domingo, Dominican Republic
Dates: November 7–9, 1997

|}

|}

Pool J
Venue:  San Antonio, United States
Dates: January 29 – February 1, 1998

Preliminary round

|}

|}

Final

|}

Final standing

Playoff
Venue:  Santo Domingo, Dominican Republic
Dates: March 12–14, 1998

|}

|}

South America
4 national teams entered qualification.

Pool K
Venue:  Buenos Aires, Argentina and  Arequipa, Peru
Dates: October 23 – November 2, 1997

|}

|}

References

 Complete Results

External links
 Results

W
W
FIVB Volleyball Women's World Championship
FIVB Volleyball World Championship qualification